Artur Khachatryan (born September 13, 1983) is an Armenian amateur boxer.

Khachatryan won a bronze medal at the 2010 European Amateur Boxing Championships in the light heavyweight division.

References

External links
www.aiba.org

1983 births
Living people
Light-heavyweight boxers
Armenian male boxers